Raisa Karmazina (born January 9, 1951, Rostov-on-Don) is a Russian political figure and deputy of the 4th, 5th, 6th, 7th, and 8th State Dumas. 

Karmazina was born in the family of Don Cossacks. From 1978 to 1993, she headed the Norilsk branch of the State Bank of the USSR. In 1980, she was elected deputy of the Norilsk City Council; and from 1990 to 1993, she was the deputy of Krasnoyarsk Council of People's Deputies. In December 2001, she became the deputy of the Legislative Assembly of Krasnoyarsk Krai. On December 7, 2003, Karmazina was elected deputy of the 4th State Duma. She was re-elected in 2007, 2011, 2016, and 2021 for the 5th, 6th, 7th, and 8th State Dumas respectively. In October 2021, she was appointed the head of the Counting Commission of the State Duma.

References

1951 births
Living people
United Russia politicians
21st-century Russian politicians
Eighth convocation members of the State Duma (Russian Federation)
Seventh convocation members of the State Duma (Russian Federation)
Sixth convocation members of the State Duma (Russian Federation)
Fifth convocation members of the State Duma (Russian Federation)
Fourth convocation members of the State Duma (Russian Federation)
Rostov State University of Economics alumni